The Principality of Nassau-Diez (Fürstentum Nassau-Diez) was a former county, later principality of the Holy Roman Empire part of the Lower Rhenish–Westphalian Circle of the empire towards the end of its history. The county was created in 1606 when the former Count of Nassau-Dillenburg's sons divided their father's lands, creating new smaller counties. In 1702, after the Glorious Revolution saw Prince William of Orange become King of England, the county was merged with others to form the new, larger, Principality of Orange-Nassau.

History 
Nassau-Diez was created in 1386 when the former County of Diez was dissolved and taken over by the House of Nassau, though it was ruled by the Counts of Nassau-Dillenburg until 1606 when it became independent.  After the creation of the county in 1606, the separate line of Nassau-Dietz was formed through inheritance. This line included not just the counts, but also served as Stadtholder of Friesland, Groningen, and Drenthe through the senior House of Orange-Nassau. When the senior line of the branch died out in 1702, the older House of Orange-Nassau inherited the lands of Nassau-Diez.

Nassau-Dillenburg 
In 1386, the last Count of Diez, Gerhard VII died, the county fell to his son-in-law, Count Adolf von Nassau-Dillenburg via his daughter Jutta. From this point, the county was now controlled by a member of the House of Nassau, creating the County of Nassau-Dillenburg. In 1530, the Counts of Nassau-Dillenburg acquired the remainder of the county and in 1564 took complete possession of Dietz Castle. This led to a renaming of the county, becoming the County of Nassau-Dietz.

Nassau-Dietz 
From 1516 to 1559, William the Rich was the reigning Count of Nassau-Dillenberg, Siegen, Vianden, and Dietz. His eldest son Wilhelm "den Schweiger", who was originally a Lutheran, raised as a Roman Catholic from the age of 11, had inherited the county. When the Holy Roman Emperor Charles V away the new Principality of Orange to his cousin René of Chalon, who inherited the county the principality in 1530, William the Silent became Prince of Orange. It was then when William founded the senior House of Orange-Nassau which continues to rule the Netherlands. In 1606 however Wilhelm the Rich died and his sons divided the counties between themselves, including his fifth son Ernest Casimir, who also served as Governor (Stadtholder) of Friesland, Groningen, and Drenthe. In 1631, he also inherited the County of Spiegelberg an der Weser.

In 1655, Nassau-Dietz was raised to the status of a principality, becoming the Principality of Nassau-Dietz. From this point, the lord of the area became the 'Prince of Nassau-Dietz'.

The counties of Nassau-Dietz and Spiegelberg along with the Frisian governorship were then successively taken over by his sons Heinrich Casimir I and Wilhelm Friedrich. When Prince William of Orange became King of England, Scotland, and Ireland (etc.) in February 1689, he declared Prince John William Friso as titular Prince of Orange. In 1702, Prince John William merged three of his titles into one: Prince of Orange, Prince of Nassau-Dietz, and Stadtholder of Friesland and Groningen into the Prince of Orange-Nassau.

Rulers 
The Counts, later Princes of Nassau-Dietz included:

Footnotes

References 

 
 
 
 

States and territories established in 1606
States and territories disestablished in the 1700s
Lower Rhenish-Westphalian Circle
History of Rhineland-Palatinate
Principalities of the Holy Roman Empire
1606 establishments in Europe
1707 disestablishments in Europe
Former monarchies of Europe